Windorah Airport  is an airport serving Windorah, Queensland, Australia. It is operated by the Barcoo Shire Council. The airport received $183,578 in funds for security upgrades from the Australian Government in 2006.

Facilities

Airlines and destinations

Services are operated under contract to the Government of Queensland and were taken over by Regional Express Airlines from 1 January 2015.

See also
 List of airports in Queensland

References

Airports in Queensland
Central West Queensland